Dark Times is a 2006, 33-issue (32 + a 'zero issue') comic book mini-series published by Dark Horse Comics. It is part of their 30th-anniversary retooling of its long-running Star Wars series of comics, replacing Republic.

The first issue was released on November 8, 2006, and is written by Randy Stradley (as Mick Harrison) from a plot by Welles Hartley.

The series is set in the Star Wars galaxy shortly after the events in Episode III: Revenge of the Sith, and about 19 years before Episode IV: A New Hope. The story begins in the days following the events in Purge by John Ostrander.

Creation 

Story: Welles Hartley
Script: Randy Stradley (as Mick Harrison)
Art: Doug Wheatley, Dave Ross, Lui Antonio
Color: Ronda Pattison, Alex Wald, Dave McCaig
Letter: Michael David Thomas, Michael Heisler
Cover Art: Doug Wheatley, Zack Howard, Brad Anderson, Travis Charest

Main characters 

Dass Jennir: Human Male, Jedi, Escaped the Jedi Purge
Bomo Greenbark: Nosaurian, Fought for the Separatist movement. Rescued Jennir after the purge. Many of his clan were killed by the Empire's clone army; the survivors were sold into slavery, including his mate and daughter.
Captain Schurk-Heren: Yarkora. Captain of the Uhumele.
Mezgraf: Togorian. Crew member. A former slave, he still bears the mark on his shoulder, but often covers it.
Ko Vakier: A swordsman with a distinguished sense of honor. He comes from a race known only as the Blood Carvers.
Janks: Phindian. The crew's chief engineer.
Meekerdin-maa, aka. "Ratty": Tintinnan. The crew's technician.
Crys Taanzer: Human Female. The crew's pilot
Kennan Taanzer: Human Male Jedi Padawan, Son of Crys. Stranded on remote moon with Master K'kruhk and several other younglings.
Master K'kruhk: One of the jedi who escaped the purge. He is stranded on a remote moon somewhere near Kessel. He is the master of Kennan Taanzer.
Lynaliskar K'ra Snyffulnimatta aka. "Sniffles": Elomin. The crew's navigator.
Mesa Greenbark: Bomo's mate.
Resa Greenbark: Bomo's daughter.
Uhumele: the central ship in the series. A medium-sized freighter, with enough firepower to combat a small squadron of fighter craft. Possibly a pirate ship, but more likely a smuggling vessel.
Darth Vader: Human Sith Lord. The former Anakin Skywalker, reeling from the injuries he suffered during Star Wars: Episode III – Revenge of the Sith and haunted by his past, wonders about his place in the newly declared Empire.
Palpatine/Darth Sidious: Human Sith Lord. The new Emperor of the galaxy works to destroy the last vestiges of the Separatists, and tries to keep his new apprentice from succumbing to self-pity.
Dezeno Qua: A wealthy male human who enjoys eating foreign species. He ate Resa Greenbark.
Orso Meeto: A well known slave trader on the slave planet Orvax IV. He sold Resa Greenbark to Dezeno Qua.

Story arcs

The Path to Nowhere 
Issues 1–5 (November 2006–October 2007) follow the events of the Republic arc Into the Unknown and take place during Dark Lord: The Rise of Darth Vader. Exiled Jedi master Dass Jennir and his friend Bomo Greenbark are the only survivors of the Galactic Empire's war on the latter's home planet. The duo sneaks onto a docked ship, and after being caught by Crys Taanzer, convinces its crew to help them escape; to avoid mandatory Imperial inspections, Jennir hatches a plan to force all the docked ships to depart at once. To find out what happened to Greenbark's family, they go to the planet where most of the Empire's captives are being taken, and find members of Greenbark's species imprisoned in pits; they learn that his wife was killed defending his daughter. Jennir infiltrates a slaver's quarters and forces him to reveal the location of Greenbark's daughter, Resa, before killing him. Jennir and his then companions travel to the mansion of the man who bought Resa, but are horrified to learn that he ate her. Jennir kills the man in order to spare Bomo the guilt, but only provokes him to angrily reveal to the entire group that Jennir is a Jedi; the group decides to depart company with the latter.

Meanwhile, Darth Vader continues to learn to submit to his new master, Emperor Palpatine, even as he must reckon with his own childhood as a slave if he is to accept the Empire's allowance of such practices.

Parallels 
Issues 6–10 (October 2007–February 2008) follow Jedi Master K'Kruhk, who survived the events of Order 66 and took several younglings under his protection, as well as Bomo and his companions as they flee the Empire. One of his crew, Janks, is captured by stormtroopers. The ship's captain reveals to Bomo that he has secured a buyer for some secret cargo. Crys consoles Bomo by telling him about the loss of her own family during the Clone Wars; her husband was killed by Separatist forces, and she agreed to let a Jedi take her son, Kennan, to train him as a Padawan. In the present, K'Kruhk trains Kennan on a fertile moon. Meanwhile, Bomo and company arrive on Mimban to make the exchange, but are double-crossed by the buyer, Haka, who is in turn double-crossed by his man Lumbra. Captain Heren reveals to Haka that he had expected the betrayal and that Lumbra has loaded a booby-trapped crate onto his own ship. Haka then tortures Heren for the location of the real merchandise as he forces Crys to work as a slave. Lumbra crash-lands near K'Kruhk's settlement, and goes to check it out. K'Kruhk sends the younglings into hiding, as Lumbra salvages their ship to repair his own. Jedi Master Chase Piru uses the Force to defend the younglings, revealing to Lumbra that he might have something more valuable than the crate he was originally trying to steal. Meanwhile, Bomo and Crys fight back against their guards. K'Kruhk and Piru split up to attack the pirates from opposing angles, even as Bomo's friends continue to liberate each other.

Vector 
Issues 11 and 12 are the fifth and sixth parts of the 12-issue multi-series crossover arc Vector, which spans across Knights of the Old Republic, Dark Times, Rebellion, and Legacy. Darth Vader interrogates Janks, while Heren tells Bomo about the contents of the mystery crate. About 1,400 years ago, it was found under a kilometer of ice, and after it was left behind in the spoils of battle, Heren and his crew found it. A new buyer, a scholar named Peturri whom Heren trusts, has placed an offer on it, but it turns out to be a trap set by Vader. Heren's crew is chained to pillars, and Vader opens the crate, revealing the ancient Jedi Celeste Morne. She attacks Vader upon learning he is Sith, despite his pleas to form an alliance with him. Peturri tries to escape, but Vader uses the Force to hold him as he transforms into a Rakghoul, before Vader slays him. Morne battles the stormtroopers as Heren frees himself and the others. They escape to the ship, but Crys succumbs to the Rakghoul plague, forcing Heren to shoot the monster. Vader escapes on his shuttle, leaving Morne on the planet below with the stormtroopers-turned-Rakghouls.

Blue Harvest 
The title is a reference to the working title of Return of the Jedi. In the prologue issue (August 2009), originally released in two parts on MySpace in January and February 2009, Dass Jennir accepts a job to defend a town from slaver gang, even as he defends himself from a rival mercenary.

Issues

Dark Times #1: The Path to Nowhere, Part 1 of 5 (Color 32 Pages, Nov 2006) $2.99
Dark Times #2: The Path to Nowhere, Part 2 of 5 (Color 32 Pages, Jan 2007) $2.99
Dark Times #3: The Path to Nowhere, Part 3 of 5 (Color 32 Pages, May 2007) $2.99
Dark Times #4: The Path to Nowhere, Part 4 of 5 (Color 32 Pages, Jul 2007) $2.99
Dark Times #5: The Path to Nowhere, Part 5 of 5 (Color 32 Pages, Oct 2007) $2.99
Dark Times #6: Parallels, Part 1 of 5 (Color 40 Pages, Oct 2007) $2.99
Dark Times #7: Parallels, Part 2 of 5 (Color 40 Pages, Dec 2007) $2.99
Dark Times #8: Parallels, Part 3 of 5 (Color 40 pages, Jan 2008) $2.99
Dark Times #9: Parallels, Part 4 of 5 (Color 40 pages, Feb 2008) $2.99
Dark Times #10: Parallels, Part 5 of 5 (Color 40 pages, Apr 2008) $2.99
Dark Times #11: Vector, Part 5 of 12  (Color 40 pages, May 2008) $2.99
Dark Times #12: Vector, Part 6 of 12  (Color 40 pages, Jun 2008) $2.99
Dark Times #0: Blue Harvest, Prologue  (Color 40 pages, Aug 2009) $2.99
Dark Times #13: Blue Harvest, Part 1 of 5  (Color 40 pages, Apr 2009) $2.99
Dark Times #14: Blue Harvest, Part 2 of 5  (Color 40 pages, Aug 2009) $2.99
Dark Times #15: Blue Harvest, Part 3 of 5  (Color 40 pages, Jan 2010) $2.99
Dark Times #16: Blue Harvest, Part 4 of 5  (Color 40 pages, Apr 2010) $2.99
Dark Times #17: Blue Harvest, Part 5 of 5  (Color 40 pages, Jun 2010) $2.99
Dark Times #18: Out of the Wilderness, Part 1 of 5 (Color 40 Pages, Aug 2011) $2.99
Dark Times #19: Out of the Wilderness, Part 2 of 5 (Color 32 Pages, Sep 2011) $2.99
Dark Times #20: Out of the Wilderness, Part 3 of 5 (Color 32 Pages, Nov 2011) $2.99
Dark Times #21: Out of the Wilderness, Part 4 of 5 (Color 32 Pages, Feb 2012) $2.99
Dark Times #22: Out of the Wilderness, Part 5 of 5 (Color 32 Pages, Apr 2012) $3.50
Dark Times #23: Fire Carrier, Part 1 of 5 (Color 32 Pages, Feb 2013) $2.99
Dark Times #24: Fire Carrier, Part 2 of 5 (Color 32 Pages, Mar 2013) $2.99
Dark Times #25: Fire Carrier, Part 3 of 5 (Color 32 Pages, Apr 2013) $2.99
Dark Times #26: Fire Carrier, Part 4 of 5 (Color 32 Pages, May 2013) $2.99
 Dark Times #27: Fire Carrier, Part 5 of 5 (Color 32 Pages, Jun 2013) $2.99
 Dark Times #28: A Spark Remains, Part 1 of 5 (Color 32 Pages, Jul 2013) $3.50
 Dark Times #29: A Spark Remains, Part 2 of 5 (Color 32 Pages, Aug 2013) $3.50
 Dark Times #30: A Spark Remains, Part 3 of 5 (Color 32 Pages, Sep 2013) $3.50
 Dark Times #31: A Spark Remains, Part 4 of 5 (Color 32 Pages, Oct 2013) $3.50
 Dark Times #32: A Spark Remains, Part 5 of 5 (Color 32 Pages, Nov 2013) $3.50

Trade Paperbacks

The Path to Nowhere ....(#s 1–5) - $17.95
Parallels ......................(#s 6–10) - $17.95
Vector .........................(#s 11-12 & KotOR 25–28) - $17.95
Blue Harvest ................(#s 13-17 & #0) - $17.95
Out of the Wilderness....(#s 18–22) - $17.99
 Fire Carrier ...................(#s 23–27) - $18.99
 A Spark Remains ...................(#s 28–32) - $19.99
 Omnibus: Dark Times Volume 1 (#s 0-12 & Republic #79-80) - $24.99

Story Arcs

The Path to Nowhere #1-5
Parallels #6-10
Dark Times: Vector #11-12 (#5-6 of Vector)
Dark Times: Blue Harvest #13-17 & #0
Dark Times: Out of the Wilderness #18-22
Dark Times: Fire Carrier #23-27
Dark Times: A Spark Remains #28-32

Reviews
 Casus Belli (v4, Issue 13 - Jan/Feb 2015)

References

External links
Dark Horse Listing
Dark Horse Press Release
Announcement on Dark Horse Message Boards
April 2007 Interview with Douglas Wheatley for Sequential Tart Webzine

2006 comics debuts
Dark Horse Comics titles
Dark Times